Charlie Enright (born 10 September 1984) is an American sailor who has competed in the Volvo Ocean Race.

Born in Rhode Island, Enright attended Brown University. He sailed in the 2011 and 2019 Fastnet Race, winning the latter, and worked for North Sails.

Enright and Mark Towill co-founded Team Alvimedica which sailed in the 2014–15 Volvo Ocean Race. Originally intended to be an all-American team, the team was American/Turkish flagged after sponsorship from Alvimedica. They were the youngest team in the fleet. Enright skippered the team and, after leading the fleet around Cape Horn and winning the final leg, they finished fifth overall.

Enright sailed in the 2017–18 Volvo Ocean Race, skippering Vestas 11th Hour Racing and finished fifth overall.

He also competed in the 2019 addition of the Transat Jacques Vabre, partnering with French skipper Pascal Bidégorry. They also competed in the Azimut Challenge (Le Défi Azimut) that year.

References

External links
 

1984 births
Living people
American male sailors (sport)
Volvo Ocean Race sailors
Brown Bears sailors